Gourcy is a department or commune of Zondoma Province in western Burkina Faso. Its capital is the town of Gourcy.

Towns and villages

References

Departments of Burkina Faso
Zondoma Province